Rehden is a municipality in the district of Diepholz, in Lower Saxony, Germany. It is situated approximately eight km east of Diepholz. The 44 TWh Rehden natural gas storage facility connects to the Rehden–Hamburg gas pipeline.

Rehden is also the seat of the Samtgemeinde ("collective municipality") Rehden.

See also 
 Rehden Geest Moor, a local nature reserve

References

Diepholz (district)